Olympique Lillois won Division 1 season 1932-1933 of the French Association Football League, the first professional football season in France, defeating AS Cannes in the final.

20 participating teams
Group A

 Club Français
 Hyères Football Club
 Olympique Lillois
 Olympique de Marseille
 FC Mulhouse
 OGC Nice
 SC Nîmes
 RC Paris
 Excelsior AC Roubaix
 FC Sète

Group B

 Olympique Alès
 FC Antibes
 AS Cannes
 SC Fives
 FC Metz
 SO Montpellier
 CA Paris
 Red Star Olympique
 Stade Rennais UC
 FC Sochaux-Montbéliard

Final table

Group A

Group B

Results

Group A

Group B

Final

Top goalscorers

References
 Division 1 season 1932-1933 at pari-et-gagne.com

Ligue 1 seasons
France
1932–33 in French football